Imago universi in Latin means "image of the universe".

In the Middle Ages the expression was used to express the representation and size of the known world at that time.

Cartographer Andreas Cellarius described his star atlas Harmonia Macrocosmica, published 1660, as "Imago universi secundum Ptolaeum" (English: "Picture of the Universe according to Ptolemy").

"Imago universi : una historia de la concepción humana del cosmos" is the title of two volumes in Spanish on cosmology.

See also 
 Ptolemy (Almagest)
 Rabanus Maurus (De Universo)
 Roger Bacon (Opus maius)

Notes 
1. Einstein, Albert: The Origins of the General Theory of Relativity, lecture given at the George A. Foundation Gibson, University of Glasgow, 20 June 1933. Published by Jackson, Wylie and co, Glasgow, 1933.

References

External links 
 http://vimeo.com/62247544
 http://imagouniversi.com

Physical cosmology
Conceptual modelling
Obsolete scientific theories